Alliance of Pan American Round Tables (also known as the Alizanza de Mesas Redondas Panamericanas, 1916-) is a women's organization founded on October 16, 1916 in San Antonio, Texas by Florence Terry Griswold. With the motto "One for All and All for One," ("Una Para Todas y Todas Para Una,") the first Round Table was created with the intention to build networks among the people of the western hemisphere and represent each republic within the Americas. PART began as a local organization, but in the 1920s chapters started to spring up across Texas. During this initial expansion, the parenting body was maintained in San Antonio. By 1944, international Round Tables had been established, and an Alliance, dubbed the Alliance of the Pan American Roundtables, was formed to unite the outreach of the various chapters. The non-partisan, non-sectarian non-governmental organization provides educational and cultural outreach programs, including a very active scholarship fund.

History

Founding 
The Mexican Revolution forced many refugees into San Antonio, Texas. Women and children in particular showed dire need for assistance. Florence Terry Griswold decided to help by opening her home to these refugees and gathering friends to provide relief in the form of food, health clinics, and English classes. Griswold recognized that women can and should set examples for the men in their lives. She believed that women are more inclined to be nurturing and understanding, and are therefore essential to improving relations between people. It was her understanding that an apolitical and nonsectarian, with no commercial purpose nor alignment with any national government could help build bridges between nations that businessmen and politicians were unable to foster due to their motivations. She thought that if she could bring women together in a nonpolitical effort to aid the women and children of the Americas, and build cross cultural understanding and friendship, men would follow suit.

On October 16, 1916, Griswold the inaugural meeting at the Menger Hotel, the charter members, besides Griswold were Mary Burleson Bee (Mrs. Carlos); Ella Dancy Dibrell (Mrs. Joseph Burton Dibrell); Anna Hertzberg (Mrs. Eli Hertzberg); Olivia Nolte (Mrs. Walter Nolte); Mary Pancoast (Mrs. Aaron C. "A. C." Pancoast); among others.

PART had many sources of inspiration. For one, there was Pan Americanism, the economic and cultural cooperation of the nations of the Americas. It was modeled after the Pan American Union where each of the 21 American countries is represented by at least one member, and members elect a General Director every few years. There was also King Arthur’s roundtable, a table in which there is no head, representing the equality of all members. And the motto “One for all and all for one” is sourced from The Three Musketeers representing mutual dedication and support from the individual to the social scale.

Expansion 
Griswold served as the first director and in 1921, the second chapter opened in Laredo and later that same year, Eugenia Schuster opened the branch in El Paso. In 1922, the chapter in Austin, as well as the state organization were founded. Griswold founded the state organization and became the first State Director to coordinate the activities of the various branches. Round Tables in other countries followed with the first branch established in Mexico City in 1928. In 1936, Ángela Acuña de Chacon founded the first branch in Costa Rica at San Jose and the following year, the Dallas chapter was founded by Katherine S. Robinson (Mrs. Stone J. Robinson).

In the early 1940s, Emma Gutiérrez Suárez joined the Mexican branch. She would later become the chapter's National Director. Upon Griswold's death in 1941, Robinson became the State Director and Nolte proposed that a scholarship, named in Griswold's honor be granted annually for young Latin American women wanting to further their education in the United States to enable them give back to their home country upon completion of their schooling. In 1944 the international body, the Alliance of Pan American Round Tables was founded in Mexico City with Robinson as the first international Director General. By 1946 a Cuban branch had been formed and by the time of the organization's fiftieth anniversary, there had been chapters created in all of the countries of the Americas except, Canada, Haiti and Venezuela.

Work

Early Activity & Accomplishments 
Much of PART’s early activity consisted of direct communication with world leaders to encourage friendly relations between the countries of the Americas. For example, in 1917, Venustiano Carranza, then president of Mexico, sent a happy birthday message to Wilhelm II. This was during World War I, and PART felt that this gesture would cause tension between Mexico and other American countries, so they sent a letter expressing their disapproval. The leaders of Belgium, France and Canada all sent messages of gratitude to PART for their actions.

They hosted, and were hosted by many officials. In 1921, they were invited to the Conference of Federate Chambers which was being held in Mexico. Snr. María Tapia organized an escort for the party of women. This marks the first time in Mexican history that a woman was invited to participate in such a high-class meeting. It also goes to show how they tried to use positive relationships between women to encourage friendly relations between nations. In 1925, PART invited Aaron Saez, who was the Mexican Secretary of Foreign Relations to San Antonio. The San Antonio mayor raised the Mexican flag over the town hall in honor of Saez’ visit. It was the first time such a courtesy was extended to a Mexican official.

Educational Efforts 
One of their early major projects was the sponsorship of a Mexican Art Exhibition at the Witte Museum. It was financed by the Carnegie Corporation and was attended by thousands. This was one of their many efforts to increase awareness of Latin American cultures. They would also hold internal projects to this end. At the San Benito Round Table, they would have regular meetings to educate members about a different Pan American country each month. Other programs include essay competitions where contestants would have to write an essay about a Pan American country for a chance to win a cash prize.

One of their most well established efforts have been scholarships. They have awarded over a million dollars to students. In 1941, the Dallas roundtable started a memorial scholarship that was used to sponsor nurses trainings. It was created with the hopes that recipients would return to their home countries, and use their education to better the lives of those living in Latin America.

Modern organization 
The present day organization has around 1,400 chapters with each operating as an autonomous entity with their own governing documents. The Alliance still prides itself on its scholarship funding. They put a lot of time and effort into raising money to give to students through internal fundraising. One of the most notable is the Griswold Memorial Scholarship, started in 1959. It is awarded to a woman from a Pan American country studying at a Texas University. The first went to a woman named Sylvia Mirea Valencia Gutierrez from Santiago, Chile who was Educational & Vocational Guidance at University of Texas at Austin. In 1991, the Florence Terry Griswold Endowment Fund was created to maintain its scholarship program in perpetuity. Individual tables also award their own scholarships. 

Members also try to educate each other on Pan American life. Sometimes that's through presenting the clothing, custom, and food of a country. Some tables have distributed newsletters to keep members up to date with current events. They have also continued to hold their conventions. They are an opportunity for members to travel together and experience Latin American cultures first hand. The 100th Anniversary of the organization was held with their biennial convention in San Antonio, Texas from October 26 to 29, 2016.

The Alliance's "Director Generals"

Archival records
The archival records of the organization were housed in Mexico City until the 1970s. In 1977, the member of the Mexico City PART chapter who was housing them at her home, brought a discussion for a permanent archive. Because the Bylaws of the Alliance required that Mexico City was required to maintain the archive, formal amendment of the governing documents had to occur. In 1978, the proposal to found a permanent archive was suggested at the convention held in Fort Worth, Texas and approved. In 1979, the records were transferred to the University of Texas at Austin library.

References

Citations

Bibliography

 

 

 
 

1916 establishments in the United States
International organizations based in the Americas
International women's organizations
United States–Caribbean relations
United States–Central American relations
United States–North American relations
United States–South American relations